In Japan, a  is a student who has graduated from middle school or high school but has failed to enter any school at the next level, or the school they were specifically aiming to enter, and consequently is studying outside of the school system for entrance in a future year. Rōnin may study at a  yobikō.

Etymology
The term rōnin is colloquial; the word  is more formal. The term derives from their having no school to attend, as a rōnin, a masterless samurai, had no leader to serve.

Sometimes, the term 二浪 (short form) or 二年浪人 (full form, 二年 - second year) is used for student who failed exams twice.

In popular culture
Rōnin appear frequently in fiction and Japanese popular culture. As an example, the manga and anime series Love Hina features three main characters, Keitaro Urashima, Naru Narusegawa, and Mutsumi Otohime, who are described as rōnin throughout most of the series. In the manga and anime series Chobits, the protagonist, Hideki Motosuwa, is a rōnin studying at a preparatory school to get into college. Maison Ikkoku also features a rōnin as its main character; the series centers around his studying for exams as he is distracted by others that he lives with.
The protagonist of Sekirei, Minato Sahashi, is also a rōnin. Kanamemo's Hinata Azuma is a roninsei as well due to her love of gambling and money making, activities which hinder her studies.

See also
Buke
Deksil
Jaesusaeng

References

External links
Rōnin-sei no Tanjō thesis at Keio University

Academic pressure in East Asian culture
Japanese words and phrases
Testing and exams in Japan

ko:재수#일본